Achen may refer to:

 Achen (surname)
 Achen, Moselle, a commune in the Grand Est region of France
 Tiroler Achen, a river in Austria
 Achen Lake, a lake in Tyrol, Austria
 Achen Pass, a pass in the Alps between Austria and Germany
 Achen, Malayalam word for Father, also used for addressing Christian priests and presbyters in Malayalam

See also
 Aachen (disambiguation)